Cherry Green may refer to:

 Cherry Green, Essex, a hamlet in England
 Cherry Green, Hertfordshire, a hamlet in England
 Cherry Smith, a vocalist